Dangerous Ishhq is a 2012 Indian Hindi-language supernatural thriller film directed by Vikram Bhatt and starring Karisma Kapoor in the lead role. The filming began on 7 September 2010. The film was released on 11 May 2012. According to BoxOfficeIndia.com, the film was a box office flop. Critics praised Kapoor for her sincere and earnest portrayal, but criticized the film overall.

Plot
The film's story spans four centuries and tells four different stories set in different time periods. Supermodel Sanjana and Rohan, son of one of the nation's foremost business tycoons, are a famous couple on the social circuit. When Sanjana decides against flying to Paris at the last minute for a lucrative modelling assignment, she does so, not just because she cannot bear to stay away from Rohan, but more importantly, because her instincts push her against going. Rohan gets abducted, and the high-profile kidnapping creates chaos in Sanjana's life. The kidnappers demand 500 million. The police, however, believe that even paying the ransom will not bring Rohan back. Shortly after Rohan gets kidnapped, Sanjana starts hearing strange noises. She has visions of Rohan calling her Geeta. With all this happening, Sanjana realises that she can read Urdu even though she has never learnt it. She informs her friend Dr. Neetu about it, who in turn refers her to a psychiatrist.

The latter informs Sanjana that Rohan's kidnapping is somehow linked to their past lives. Sanjana undergoes a past life regression where she sees herself as Geeta, a young Hindu girl in love with Iqbal, a Muslim boy. Her entire family, including her sister Chanda (who is none other than Neetu), has been killed by her uncle. Iqbal suggests that the only way Geeta can escape her death is by leaving Landi Kotal and settling down in Amritsar. Later, it is revealed that Iqbal's friend Aarif is the antagonist. His purpose is to separate the two lovers because he supposes Geeta's family to be a collaborator. He was Durgam Sah's third face who decided to split the two many centuries back.

Sanjana's next life is that of a Muslim girl, Salma. Again, she loves a young man named Ali. The latter leaves for war with his companion Rashid. When the war is over, everyone returns except for Ali. Rashid informs Salma that her lover has been killed. It is later revealed by a tawaif (Neetu's first birth) that Ali is alive and that Rashid planned to separate the two lovers. With this particular regression, it is also revealed that Rohan's younger brother Rahul is involved in his brother's kidnapping.

Sanjana's last past life is that of a young queen's maid named Paro. She is secretly in love with Raj Dutt. The Commander-in-Chief of Rajputana Durgam Sah also loves her. Durgam Sah asks her to marry him, or else he shall have Rajdutt killed. When she thought nothing could be worse then the other, she goes to him and confesses to have ingested poison so as to die untarnished. Watching her die, Durgam takes her to a psychic named Mantra, who reveals that due to the vardaan of Mirabai to Paro, the bonding of Paro and Rajdutt is now unbreakable. They will be together forever in their every life, to which Durgam replies that if there can be a reincarnation of Rajdutt and Paro, he will also reincarnate but in a different form. He asks Mantra to give him the power to remember everything regarding his current life so that he can continue to separate the two lovers in the next lifetimes. That being said, Durgam Sah, Rashid, and Aarif all have the same soul but different faces. Their only aim is to separate Sanjana and Rohan. The question remains: in which form did Durgam Sah take birth during the present life?

After going through all her lives, Sanjana decides to find out where Rohan is and who is today's Durgam Sah. She ultimately forms a plan and informs her friend Neetu and a police officer about faking her death. Now declared dead by the doctor in front of ACP Singh and Neetu, it is shown that the new Durgam Sah is giving orders to his men to leave Rohan on his own as he will be dead in a few minutes. During the climax, it is finally revealed that ACP Singh is the new Durgam Sah. Sanjana recognises who ACP Singh is by a mark on his shoulder in a dangerous cat-and-mouse game. She then proceeds to wound him fatally. This breaks the cycle, and it is revealed that Sanjana and Rohan's souls will be together forever.

Cast 
 Karisma Kapoor as Sanjana/Geeta/Salma/Paro
 Rajneesh Duggal as Rohan/Iqbal/Ali/Raj Dutt
 Ravi Kissen as Durgam Sah (Durgam Sah's first life)
 Sameer Kochhar as Rashid (Durgam Sah's second life)
 Arya Babbar as Aarif (Durgam Sah's third life)
 Jimmy Sheirgill as Corrupt Assistant Commissioner of Police Officer Bhargav Singh (Durgam Sah's fourth and last life)
 Divya Dutta as Neetu/Chanda/Tawaif
 Ruslaan Mumtaz as Rahul Thakral
 Vikas Shrivastav as Inspector Arbaaz Sheikh
 Manish Malhotra in a cameo appearance playing himself
 Gracy Singh as Meera (Special Appearance in song "Lagan Lagi")
 Bikramjeet Kanwarpal
 Natasha Sinha as Mantra

Production
This film marked the comeback of Karisma Kapoor after a break of six years.

Reception

Critical reception
Rajeev Masand of CNN-IBN gave the movie 1.5 stars out of 5, noting that "Ambitious but seriously flawed, the film smacks of laziness in virtually all departments, and even Karisma Kapoor's earnest performance can't save the day. I'm going with one-and-a-half out of five for director Vikram Bhatt's 'Dangerous Ishq'. Plodding on for close to two hours and thirty minutes, this film will make you wish you'd knocked back a stiff one before taking your seat."

Kathika Kandpal of Filmfare gave the movie 2 stars out of 5, concluding that "Watch this and you might feel Karisma's Baaz – A Bird in Danger (2003) was a classic." Taran Adarsh of Bollywood Hungama gave the movie 1.5 stars out of 5, commenting that "On the whole, Dangerous Ishqq is no patch on Vikram Bhatt's earlier achievements. This fantasy-driven film is an epic disappointment!" Mansha Rastogi of Now Running gave the movie 1 star out of 5, quoting that "Dangerous Ishhq is definitely very dangerous... to your sensibilities! Beware!" Blessy Chettiar of DNA India gave the movie 1 star out of 5, writing that "Dangerous Ishhq is like watching a Dr Brian Weiss book in 3D, after about 30 pages, it gets monotonous and uninteresting. There's only so much curiosity you can have in somebody else's life. By the end of the ordeal you wish to be treated to a past life regression theory to find out what was it that drew you to it. Go curse your karma now." Shubhra Gupta of Indian Express gave the movie 0.5 stars out of 5, noting that "Karisma looks unbelievably trim for a 'do-bachchon-ki-amma', but that doesn't stop her from sliding all the way back into her familiar 90s style acting, where everything was over the top, from arch expressions to clothes to make-up. This is a terrible film, with not one redeeming factor."

Box office
The film's final total was approximately  nett.
Dangerous Ishhq grossed  in the overseas markets.
Box Office India called it "one of the major flop of the year''.

Soundtrack

The music of the film was composed by Himesh Reshammiya and the lyrics were penned by Sameer and Shabbir Ahmed. One remix was by Kary Arora.

References

External links
 Official Website
 

Indian 3D films
2010s Hindi-language films
2012 horror thriller films
2010s supernatural horror films
2010s supernatural thriller films
Films directed by Vikram Bhatt
Films scored by Himesh Reshammiya
2012 3D films
2012 films
Films about reincarnation
Indian supernatural horror films
Indian horror thriller films
Indian supernatural thriller films
Reliance Entertainment films